Beidu may refer to:

 Taiyuan, a city in China, formerly known as Beidu during the Tang Dynasty

See also
 Baidu, a Chinese web company
 Beidou (disambiguation)